Oak Hill Township is an inactive township in Crawford County, in the U.S. state of Missouri.

Oak Hill Township was named after the community of Oak Hill, Missouri.

References

Townships in Missouri
Townships in Crawford County, Missouri